Katherine Cassavetes (née Demetre; June 24, 1906 – March 29, 1983) was an American actress. She was the mother of actor-director John Cassavetes and mother-in-law of actress Gena Rowlands. Her grandchildren are actor-directors Nick Cassavetes, Zoe Cassavetes, and Alexandra Cassavetes. She appeared in four films, three of which were written and directed by her son, including Minnie and Moskowitz (1971).

Partial filmography
Minnie and Moskowitz (1971) - Sheba Moskowitz
The Teacher (1974) - Gossiping Lady 1 
A Woman Under the Influence (1974) - Margaret Longhetti
Opening Night (1977) - Vivian (final film role)

References

External links

1906 births
1983 deaths
American film actresses
Actresses from New York City
People from Greater Los Angeles
Katherine
20th-century American actresses